Oxyloma sarsii is a species of small European land snail, a terrestrial pulmonate gastropod mollusk belonging to the family Succineidae, the amber snails.

Description
Only reliably separated from the very similar Oxyloma elegans by dissection

Distribution
This species is known to occur in a number of European countries and islands including:
 Great Britain
 Ireland
 Netherlands
 Poland
 Bulgaria
 Ukraine
 and other areas

Habitat
This snail lives at the water line, at the edges of rivers and lakes.

References

External links
 Oxyloma sarsii at Animalbase taxonomy,short description, distribution, biology,status (threats), images

Succineidae
Gastropods described in 1886